Aslan Ahmadov (born 12 February 1973, in Baku) is a Russian fashion designer and photographer of Azerbaijani origin. He is a Member of Photographer's Union of Russia.

Biographical dates and creative activities 
Aslan Ahmadov was born on 12, February 1973 in Baku. He graduated directing faculty in Azerbaijan Academy of Arts named after Samed Vurgun. In 1991 he moved to Moscow and thanks to creation of unusual and bright images in photography he became one of the leading photographers, who cooperates with TV-stars. Now he works with the main fashion-papers, such as Harpers Bazaar, Elle, MAXIM, FHM, OM, Dolce Vita, NRG, Beauty.

In 2003 he founded creative trio "Fresh Art" – brand name, which symbolizes beauty, fashion and unreachable luxury in design, photography and clothes and influences modern industry of Russian fashion. The members of that project have art education – one of them is a musician, the other one is a choreographer, the last one is an artist. The result of their creation is that Montserrat Caballe, Marilyn Manson, famous tennis players sisters Williams wear these clothes.

In 2006 – photo-exposition "Zoom" took place in Moscow, Red Square, which was visited by many well-known people of the city, who were the characters of the photo.

In 2007 – fashion show "Meat" (the part of Russian Week of Fashion). The show attracted an enormous number of visitors. It's dedicated to women-victims of male violence, murdered cows, vegetarians and defenders of animal rights.

In 2008 he became an anchorman of cycle of TV-program "Fashion Police" in the channel "Muz-TV". In this program they gave advice about fashion to celebrities without tastefulness.

In 2010 he became a co-author TV-project "Бабье лето" (Indian summer) in TV-channel "Domashny". There were many great actresses of Sovet Cinema such as Elina Bystritskaya, Lyudmila Chursina, Vera Vasilyeva, Rimma Markova, Ada Rogovtseva, Inna Makarova, Irina Pechernikova, Olga Aroseva, Natalya Varley, Tamara Semina, Irina Miroshnechenko, Tatiana Konyukhova, Irina Skobtseva, Zinaida Kiriyenko, Tatyana Vasilyeva, Irina Alferova, Lyudmila Kasatkina, Eugene Uvarova, Svetlana Svetlichnaya, who became characters of this documentary film.

In 2011 Aslan Ahmadov became a member of Photographer's Union of Russia.

In that year he opened his personal exposition called "Бабье лето" (Indian summer), what took place in the course of the year in different towns of Russia (Moscow, St. Petersburg, Samara, Perm, Kazan, Rostov-on-Don, Irkutsk, Yekaterinburg, Novosibirsk, Nizhny Novgorod, Krasnoyarsk, Ufa, etc.)

In 2011–2012 he worked on a book about People's Artist of the USSR Lyudmila Gurchenko. The book contains studio portraits made in recent years of the great actress. The artist's creation is filled with passion, exposure of human emotion and sincerity of naked bodies, romanticism.

November 2012 – he sold a photo called "Руки Людмилы Гурченко" (The Hands of Lyudmila Gurchenko) in the auction Phillips de Pury in London. It cost £3750.

December 2012 – opening the first exposition of "RED" in the Moscow Museum of Modern Art.

The exposition RED 
The first Aslan Ahmadov's exposition from series "RED" was opened in 10, December 2012. There were a lot of Russian celebrities.

25, April 2013 they opened the exhibition in Ekaterinburg Gallery of Modern Art. Then this works can be seen by citizens of St. Petersburg, Rostov-on-Don, Kyiv and other cities.

Distinctive understanding of beauty and perfection, what are shown by Aslan Ahmadov resonated with representatives of the international company Nobel Biocare, which activity is connected with embodiment in the life harmony and aesthetics. Holding became general partner of the art project, what have charitable motives: the part of the money from the sale of pictures transfers to the local funds of seriously ill children, care for orphans in families and bringing attention to their problems.

See also 
 List of photographers
 Fine-art photography
 Fashion photography

References

Further reading

External links 
 
 

1973 births
Russian artists
Russian graphic designers
Russian fashion designers
Living people
Russian people of Azerbaijani descent